The 2015 Miami Hurricanes football team (variously "Miami", "The U", "UM", "'Canes") represented the University of Miami during the 2015 NCAA Division I FBS football season. The Hurricanes were led by fifth-year head coach Al Golden, who was fired following a 58–0 loss at home to Clemson, and replaced by Larry Scott, who acted as the interim coach. They played their home games at Sun Life Stadium in Miami Gardens, Florida. It was the Hurricanes' 90th overall season and their 12th as a member of the Atlantic Coast Conference. They finished the season 8–5, 5–3 in ACC play to finish in 3rd place in the Coastal Division. They were invited to the Sun Bowl, where they lost to Washington State.

On December 4, 2015, the university announced Mark Richt as head coach, effective immediately.

Personnel

Coaching staff

Support staff

Schedule

Roster
As of May 2015

Game summaries

Bethune-Cookman

at Florida Atlantic

Nebraska

at Cincinnati

at Florida State

Virginia Tech

Clemson

at Duke

Virginia

at North Carolina

Georgia Tech

at Pittsburgh

vs. Washington State–Sun Bowl

2016 NFL Draft

References

Miami
Miami Hurricanes football seasons
Miami Hurricanes football